Christiane Jentsch (born 13 July 1961; in marriage was known as Christiane Scheibel) is a former German curler.

She won a gold medal at the 1992 Winter Olympics when curling was a demonstration sport.

She was skip of women's team of Curling Club Füssen in 1980-1984 and 1994-2001. In seasons 1985/1986 and 1991/1992 she played in Andrea Schöpp's team out of SC Riessersee (Garmisch-Partenkirchen).

Christiane Jentsch retired from competitive curling in 2002.

Teams

References

External links

CYRUS MAKOWSKI · Lawyers · Hamburg · Berlin | Dr. Christiane Jentsch

Living people
1961 births
German female curlers
Curlers at the 1992 Winter Olympics
Olympic curlers of Germany
Place of birth missing (living people)